Sisse Reingaard (born Anne-Marie Reingaard; 23 September 1946) is a Danish film actress. She appeared in 28 films between 1965 and 1980.

Selected filmography
 Gift (1966)
 Der var engang (1966)
 The Egborg Girl (1969)
 Jazz All Around (1969)
 The Key to Paradise (1970)
 Tough Guys of the Prairie (1970)
 Where Is the Body, Moeller? (1971)

External links

1946 births
Living people
Danish film actresses